William H. Ryan Jr. is an American politician and attorney who served as the acting Attorney General of Pennsylvania from January through May 2011. On August 19, 2011, he was appointed to a three-year term as the fourth Chairman of the Pennsylvania Gaming Control Board by Governor Tom Corbett.

Education
Ryan is a graduate of Saint Joseph's University and Villanova University Law School.

Legal career
He assumed the office of Attorney General when Tom Corbett resigned to take office as Governor of Pennsylvania. Before this he was first deputy Attorney General and also previously served as the District Attorney for Delaware County. He has worked in the Attorney General's office since 1997. Ryan served as Attorney General until his nominated successor, Linda Kelly, was confirmed by the State Senate.

Personal life
He lives in Delaware County, and is married with two sons.

References

Pennsylvania Republicans
People from Delaware County, Pennsylvania
Pennsylvania Attorneys General
County district attorneys in Pennsylvania
Members of American gaming commissions
Gambling in Pennsylvania
Pennsylvania lawyers
Villanova University School of Law alumni
Saint Joseph's University alumni
Living people
Year of birth missing (living people)